The decade of the 1240s in art involved some significant events.

Events
 c.1240: Oxford manuscript illuminator William de Brailes incorporates in illustrations to a book of hours and a psalter named self-portraits, among the earliest known.
 1248: April 26: Consecration of Sainte Chapelle, Paris, noted for its stained glass.

Paintings
 1244: Chen Rong – Nine Dragons
 1246: Ma Lin – The Wind in the Pines Listening

Births
 1240: Cimabue, Italian (Florentine) painter and creator of mosaics (died 1302)
 1240: Arnolfo di Cambio, Italian architect and sculptor (died 1300/1310)
 1245: Araniko, Nepalese painter and architect (died 1306)
 1245: Li Kan, Chinese Yuan dynasty painter (died 1320)
 1247: Yishan Yining, Chinese Buddhist monk, calligrapher, writer and teacher (died 1317)
 1248: Gao Kegong, Chinese Yuan dynasty painter (died 1310)

Deaths
 1249: Wuzhun Shifan, Han Chinese painter, calligrapher and prominent Zen Buddhist (born 1178)
 1242: Bonaventura Berlinghieri, Italian Gothic painter (born 1215)
 1241: Fujiwara no Teika, Japanese poet, critic, calligrapher, novelist, anthologist, scribe and scholar (born 1162)

References

 
Years of the 13th century in art
Art